Duleh-ye Garm (also Romanized as Dūleh-ye Garm; also known as Dowla Garm, Dowlā Garm, and Dūleh-ye Karam) is a village in Baryaji Rural District, in the Central District of Sardasht County, West Azerbaijan Province, Iran. At the 2006 census, its population was 392, in 89 families.

References 

Populated places in Sardasht County